David Kiefer (born September 16, 1984) is the current head coach of the Southeastern Louisiana Lions basketball team.

Head coaching record

References

External links
Southeastern Louisiana Lions Coaching bio

1984 births
Living people
American men's basketball coaches
Basketball coaches from Florida
Cincinnati Bearcats men's basketball coaches
College men's basketball head coaches in the United States
Junior college men's basketball coaches in the United States
Kansas State University alumni
Kansas State Wildcats men's basketball coaches
Salem International University alumni
South Carolina Gamecocks men's basketball coaches
Southeastern Louisiana Lions basketball coaches
Sportspeople from St. Petersburg, Florida
UCF Knights men's basketball coaches